Magasi (also Romanized as Magasī) is a village in Fathabad Rural District, in the Central District of Baft County, Kerman Province, Iran. At the 2006 census, its population was 16, in 6 families.

References 

Populated places in Baft County